Mufti Yūsuf Bangālī was a 16th-century Sufi pir of the Shattari order. He was a prominent teacher during the reign of the Farooqui dynasty and Mughal emperor Akbar.

Background
Yusuf originated from Bengal. He travelled across the subcontinent for further Islamic studies, eventually becoming a student and disciple of Wajihuddin Alvi, who was also the teacher of Usman Bengali. After gaining sufficient training from Alvi, he was permitted to migrate to Burhanpur where he maintained a khanqah as well as a madrasa.

Yusuf became one of the most prominent scholars of the Shattari order of Bengali descent, others being Ali Sher of Sylhet and Shah Manjhan of Lakhnauti. Pir Muhammad bin Abdul Halim was a longtime student of Yusuf, and Isa Burhanpuri was another notable student of Yusuf Bengali. Yusuf would also circumcise Muslim children after their birth, and most notably, Yusuf circumcised Sakah Ji Burhanpuri who would later become a leading Islamic scholar in Burhanpur. Although Yusuf had many students, he did not accept anyone to be his murid (disciple), and instead directed his followers to his contemporary Tahir Yusuf Sindhi. He also had the same mentality for his two sons, Abdullah and Abdur-Rahman, both of whom became disciples of Sindhi.

Spiritual genealogy
Spiritual genealogy of Yusuf Bengali is as follows:
 Prophet Muhammad
 Ali ibn Abi Talib
 Husayn ibn Ali
 Zayn al-Abidin
 Muhammad al-Baqir
 Ja'far al-Sadiq
 Isma'il ibn Ja'far
 Abu Bakr al Ajli
 Taqi ad-Din Najib
 Ahmad as-Siddiq
 Sima al-Wasil
 Farid ad-Din Attar
 Khatir ad-Din Bayazid
 Muhammad Ghawth Gwaliori
 Wajihuddin Alvi
 Yusuf Bengali

See also
Usman Bengali, another 16th-century Bengali Muslim scholar who moved to North India

References

Bibliography

16th-century Bengalis
Bengali Muslim scholars of Islam
16th-century Muslim theologians
People from Burhanpur district